The Cathedral of the Madeleine is a Roman Catholic church in Salt Lake City, Utah, United States. It was completed in 1909 and currently serves as the cathedral, or mother church, of the Diocese of Salt Lake City. It is the only cathedral in the U.S. under the patronage of St. Mary Magdalene.

Description
The cathedral was built under the direction of Lawrence Scanlan, the first bishop of Salt Lake City, who dedicated it to St. Mary Magdalene. It was designed by architects Carl M. Neuhausen and Bernard O. Mecklenburg. The exterior is predominantly a Neo-Romanesque design, while the inside displays  more Neo-Gothic details. Construction began in 1900 and was completed in 1909. It was dedicated by James Cardinal Gibbons, Archbishop of Baltimore.

It is theorized that Bishop Scanlan chose Mary Magdalene as the patron saint of the Diocese of Salt Lake because her feast day is on July 22, two days before Pioneer Day, a celebration commemorating the arrival of the Mormon pioneers in Salt Lake Valley, so that Catholics would have something to celebrate alongside the region's dominant faith.

The interior of the cathedral was created under the direction of Joseph S. Glass, the second bishop of Salt Lake. Bishop Glass enlisted John Theodore Comes, one of the preeminent architects in the country, to decorate the interior of the cathedral. His plans for the interior were largely based upon the Spanish Gothic style. The colorful murals and polychrome were added at this time, as were the ornate shrines. In 1916, Bishop Glass also changed the name of the cathedral to the French spelling after visiting her purported tomb.

In the 1970s, the exterior of the building was restored, and between 1991 and 1993, the interior of the cathedral was renovated and restored under Bishop William K. Weigand. This included not only the removal of dust and dirt and restoration of the interior but also changes to the liturgical elements of the cathedral to bring them into conformity with certain widespread changes in liturgical practice that developed after the Second Vatican Council.

This included constructing a new altar, moving the cathedra, creating a separate chapel for the Blessed Sacrament, and adding an ample baptismal font. The Blessed Sacrament Chapel also contains the tomb of Bishop Scanlan. Resting atop the tomb is a case containing a small relic of Saint Mary Magdalene. The cathedral in Salt Lake City and the Basilica of Saint-Maximin-la-Sainte-Baume in France are the only cathedrals in the world holding first-class relics of the saint and are named in her honor. The major restoration of the interior of the cathedral was accomplished through the vision of Monsignor M. Francis Mannion.

The cathedral is home to the only co-educational Catholic Choir School in the United States. The Madeleine Choir School, established in 1996, now serves over 400 students in Pre-Kindergarten through Grade Eight. The Cathedral Choir has recorded several CDs and routinely tours both nationally and internationally. In addition to singing daily services at the Cathedral of the Madeleine, choristers have sung at St. Peter's Basilica (Vatican City), Notre Dame de Paris (France), and in churches across the United States of America, Spain, Italy, France, Belgium, and Germany, among other places.

Composer Amédée Tremblay notably served as the church's organist from 1920 to 1925.

See also

 List of Catholic cathedrals in the United States
 List of cathedrals in the United States
 National Register of Historic Places listings in Salt Lake City

References

External links

 
 Diocese of Salt Lake City Official Site
 360° Panorama of the Cathedral of the Madeleine.
 Madeleine Choir School official site

Madeleine
Churches on the National Register of Historic Places in Utah
Churches in the Roman Catholic Diocese of Salt Lake City
Churches in Salt Lake City
Roman Catholic churches completed in 1909
Cathedrals in Utah
National Register of Historic Places in Salt Lake City
Mary Magdalene
20th-century Roman Catholic church buildings in the United States